Hillery Melvin Witt (1945-2013) is a former American football defensive end and defensive tackle. 

Witt was born in Fort Worth, Texas, in 1945. He attended Dunbar High School in Fort Worth and played college football at Arlington State (now known as Texas–Arlington) from 1964 to 1966. He was the first African-American athlete in Arlington State's history.

Witt played professionally in the American Football League (AFL) and National Football League (NFL) for the Boston Patriots (1967-1970). He appeared in 35 games for the Patriots, 13 as a starter.

References

1945 births
Living people
American football defensive ends
Texas–Arlington Mavericks football players
Boston Patriots players
Players of American football from Fort Worth, Texas
American football defensive tackles